Nicolai Peak is the ice-covered peak rising to 1342 m in Havre Mountains, northern Alexander Island in Antarctica. It has steep and partly ice-free southwest slopes, and surmounts Lennon Glacier to the north and east, and Pipkov Glacier to the south.

The feature is named after the Bulgarian opera singer Elena Nicolai (Stoyanka Nikolova, 1905-1993).

Location
British mapping in 1971.

Maps
 British Antarctic Territory. Scale 1:200000 topographic map. DOS 610 – W 69 70. Tolworth, UK, 1971
 Antarctic Digital Database (ADD). Scale 1:250000 topographic map of Antarctica. Scientific Committee on Antarctic Research (SCAR). Since 1993, regularly upgraded and updated

Notes

References
 Bulgarian Antarctic Gazetteer. Antarctic Place-names Commission. (details in Bulgarian, basic data in English)
 Nicolai Peak. SCAR Composite Gazetteer of Antarctica

External links
 Nicolai Peak. Copernix satellite image

Mountains of Alexander Island
Bulgaria and the Antarctic